Coast is a 2022 American drama film written by Cindy Kitagawa, directed by Jessica Hester and Derek Schweickart and starring Melissa Leo.

Cast
Fátima Ptacek as Abby Evans
Mia Rose Frampton as Kristi Lewis
Mia Xitlali as Kat Acosta
Kane Ritchotte as Dave
Ciara Bravo as Cassie
Melissa Leo as Olivia
Cristela Alonzo as Debora Avila

Release
The film was released in theaters and on VOD on April 8, 2022.

Reception
The film has a 71% rating on Rotten Tomatoes based on seventeen reviews.

Alex Saveliev of Film Threat rated the film a 6 out of 10.

Richard Whittaker of The Austin Chronicle awarded the film two stars out of five.

References

External links